Anna Reynolds is an Australian politician and the current Lord Mayor of Hobart, Tasmania.

Education and early career
Reynolds graduated from Australian National University with a Bachelor of Arts in 1987, majoring in Political Science, and completed a Master of Management from the University of Technology Sydney in 1996.

Reynolds began her career establishing a community legal centre in Northern Queensland, before moving into a number of campaigning and advocacy roles. She served as President of the Cairns and far North Environment Centre (CAFNEC) during the 1990s.

After four years with the Australian Conservation Foundation, in 1998 Reynolds founded the Climate Action Network Australia - the Australian environment movement's first collective campaign on climate change.

In 2002, Reynolds moved on to her first of two roles with leading conservation organisation WWF. Between 2002 and 2005, Reynolds established and managed WWF Australia's first climate change program, then from 2005 to 2008, she held a role as Deputy Leader of WWF International's Global Climate Program.

In 2009, Reynolds moved to Hobart to take up an advisory role in the office of Bob Brown, then leader of the Australian Greens. She then became the CEO of the Multicultural Council of Tasmania in 2013.

City of Hobart
From 2014 to 2018, Reynolds was a Hobart City Council Alderman, with her candidacy backed by the Tasmanian Greens. She was Chair of the Parks and Recreation Committee during her term.

In November 2018, after standing as an Independent, Reynolds was elected Lord Mayor of Hobart, securing 63.35% of the vote and beating former Lord Mayor Damon Thomas into second place. The turnout in the 2018 election was the highest since the 1990s, with 61.94% of eligible electors in the City of Hobart turning out to vote. Reynolds' election to Lord Mayor was only the third time a woman had been voted into the position.

Personal life
Reynolds is the daughter of historian Henry Reynolds and former Queensland ALP Senator Margaret Reynolds.

References

External links
 Anna Reynolds
 Hobart City Council website

Living people
Australian National University alumni
Mayors and Lord Mayors of Hobart
Year of birth missing (living people)
Women mayors of places in Tasmania
Tasmanian local councillors